The following is a list of Grammy Awards winners and nominees from Mali:

Notes

References

Malian
 Grammy
Grammy